Eupterote kageri is a moth in the family Eupterotidae. It was described by Wolfgang A. Nässig in 1989. It is found on Sumatra.

References

Moths described in 1989
Eupterotinae